Palpopleura sexmaculata, commonly known as the Asian widow or blue-tailed yellow skimmer, is a species of dragonfly in the family Libellulidae. It is widespread in several countries in South, East and Southeast Asia, but is no longer believed to occur in Sri Lanka.

Description and habitat
It is a small dragonfly with brown capped greenish eyes. Its thorax is greenish yellow and hind-wings usually tinted with yellow from the base. Pterostigma is black in adults bi-colored in juveniles and sub-adults as in females. Its abdomen is pruinosed with light blue, leaving segments 1-3 as yellow. Sub-adult males and females are yellow. The pterostigma of the female are bi-colored with half black and half yellow. It breeds in marshy areas and small pools in the hills.

See also 
 List of odonates of Sri Lanka
 List of odonates of India
 List of odonata of Kerala

References

 sexmaculata.html World Dragonflies
 Animal diversity web
 Query Results
 Sri Lanka Biodiversity

External links

Libellulidae
Insects described in 1787